In geometry, a triakis octahedron (or trigonal trisoctahedron or kisoctahedron) is an Archimedean dual solid, or a Catalan solid. Its dual is the truncated cube.

It can be seen as an octahedron with triangular pyramids added to each face; that is, it is the Kleetope of the octahedron. It is also sometimes called a trisoctahedron, or, more fully, trigonal trisoctahedron. Both names reflect that it has three triangular faces for every face of an octahedron. The tetragonal trisoctahedron is another name for the deltoidal icositetrahedron, a different polyhedron with three quadrilateral faces for every face of an octahedron.

This convex polyhedron is topologically similar to the concave stellated octahedron. They have the same face connectivity, but the vertices are in different relative distances from the center.

If its shorter edges have length 1, its surface area and volume are:

Cartesian coordinates 

The length of the long edges equals , and that of the short edges .

The faces are isosceles triangles with one obtuse and two acute angles. The obtuse angle equals  ≈ ° and the acute ones equal  ≈ °.

Orthogonal projections
The triakis octahedron has three symmetry positions, two located on vertices, and one mid-edge:

Cultural references
 A triakis octahedron is a vital element in the plot of cult author Hugh Cook's novel The Wishstone and the Wonderworkers.

Related polyhedra 
The triakis octahedron is one of a family of duals to the uniform polyhedra related to the cube and regular octahedron.

The triakis octahedron is a part of a sequence of polyhedra and tilings, extending into the hyperbolic plane. These face-transitive figures have (*n32) reflectional symmetry.

 

The triakis octahedron is also a part of a sequence of polyhedra and tilings, extending into the hyperbolic plane. These face-transitive figures have (*n42) reflectional symmetry.

References

  (Section 3-9)
  (The thirteen semiregular convex polyhedra and their duals, Page 17, Triakisoctahedron)
 The Symmetries of Things 2008, John H. Conway, Heidi Burgiel, Chaim Goodman-Strass,   (Chapter 21, Naming the Archimedean and Catalan polyhedra and tilings, page 284, Triakis octahedron)

External links
 
 Triakis Octahedron – Interactive Polyhedron Model
 Virtual Reality Polyhedra www.georgehart.com: The Encyclopedia of Polyhedra
 VRML model
 Conway Notation for Polyhedra Try: "dtC"

Catalan solids